Alexandru Lăpușan (1 February 1955  – 17 May 2016) was a Romanian politician who served as Minister of Agriculture in Nicolae Văcăroiu's Cabinet (1992–1996). He was member of the Chamber of Deputies (1990–1992) for Cluj County, being named by the National Salvation Front. He was also Mayor of Dej in 1991.

External links 
Alexandru Lăpușan on Chamber of Deputies official site.

References 

1955 births
2016 deaths
Romanian Ministers of Agriculture
20th-century Romanian politicians
People from Țăndărei
Members of the Chamber of Deputies (Romania)
Bucharest Academy of Economic Studies alumni